Ina Catani, born Heilborn 30 May 1906, died 28 March 1938, was a Swedish archer.

Merits
 World champion 1935, Sweden's first female world champion.

References 

1906 births
1938 deaths
Swedish female archers
20th-century Swedish women